Andrew Wiggin may refer to:

 Andrew Wiggin (judge) (1671–1756), American judge
 Andrew "Ender" Wiggin, fictional title character in the Ender's Game science fiction novel series

See also
Andrew Wiggins (born 1995), Canadian basketball player
Andrew Higgins (disambiguation)